Yugoslavia has participated in the Eurovision Young Dancers 3 times.

Participation overview

See also
Yugoslavia in the Eurovision Song Contest
Yugoslavia in the Eurovision Young Musicians

External links 
 Eurovision Young Dancers

Countries in the Eurovision Young Dancers